The African People's Party – Côte d'Ivoire (PPA–CI) is an Ivorian political party founded in 2021 in the wake of the return to Côte d'Ivoire of former President Laurent Gbagbo, who preferred creating this new formation rather than trying to retake the position of head of the party which he had created in 1982 with his wife Simone Gbagbo, the Ivorian Popular Front (FPI).

Organizational chart 
On October 25, 2021, a “Strategic and Political Council” was created, the members of which are:

 Assoa Adou, president
 Sébastien Djédjé Dano, 1st vice-president
 Justin Koné Katinan, 2nd vice-president and party spokesperson
 Emmanuel Auguste Ackah, Chief of Staff to President Laurent Gbagbo
 Laurent Akoun
 Massany Bamba
 Alphonse Douati
 Stéphane Aymar Kipré
 Richard Kodjo
 Pascal Dago Kokora
 Boubacar Koné
 Kouakou André Kouassi
 Douayoua Lia Bi
 Moïse Lida Kouassi
 Odette Likikouet Sauyet
 Marie-Odette Lorougnon Gnabry
 Georges Armand Ouégnin

Hubert Oulaye was appointed executive chairman and Damana Pickass general secretary of the party.

The deputy spokesperson is Habiba Touré.

References

2021 establishments in Ivory Coast
Democratic socialist parties in Africa
Pan-Africanism in Ivory Coast
Political parties established in 2021
Political parties in Ivory Coast
Socialist parties in Ivory Coast